Dream FM was a 1990s pirate radio station based in Leeds, West Yorkshire, that played a diverse range of dance music and was renowned for its professional style. It first broadcast on 104.9 FM in October 1992, changing to a simulcast on 99.9 FM then settling on FM 99.9 until early 1994 when it moved to 107.8 FM and could be received throughout Yorkshire.

In 1995, Dream launched a campaign to become a legal station. However, despite a petition and public support, Dream would not secure a licence and instead one was awarded to Kiss 105. Dream was last heard around November 1995.

DJs and presenters on the station included Paul Taylor, Shock, Daisy & Havoc, Tantra  Countdown, Tony Walker, Chris Martin, Marc Leaf and Mark Dawson.

References

Radio stations in Yorkshire
Pirate radio stations in the United Kingdom
Radio stations established in 1992
Radio stations disestablished in 1995
Defunct radio stations in the United Kingdom